Skyhammer is a shooter video game developed by Rebellion Developments and published by Songbird Productions for the Atari Jaguar on May 22, 2000. Its gameplay style is reminiscent of Psygnosis' G-Police for the PlayStation, which was released three years prior to the game.

Skyhammer has a dystopian science fiction setting inspired by Blade Runner. The story takes place in the year 2022 where the player, working as a junior mercenary pilot under the umbrella of the Cytox corporation, takes control of the titular aircraft in order to fight against other corporate factions, retrieve objects, among other tasks across various megacities. Conceived in 1992 and originally announced in 1994, the game was previewed and reviewed on multiple magazines but it was left unreleased after Atari Corporation discontinued the Jaguar and merged with JT Storage in 1996, until it was licensed and published by Songbird Productions in 2000, a year after the system was declared as an open platform by Hasbro Interactive.

Skyhammer received positive reception when it was reviewed in 1996 prior to cancellation, with critics praising the texture-mapped 3D graphics but was criticized for its low framerate. It was referred by publications such as Computer and Video Games and Ultimate Future Games as one of the best games for the system.

Gameplay 

Skyhammer is a shooter game, similar to G-Police, in which the player pilots the titular Skyhammer, a heavily armed aircraft and the action is strictly viewed within the cockpit in first-person, while combat in the game involves both dogfighting and dropping bombs against a variety of enemy aircraft, drones, gun turrets and tanks. There are two control methods for the aircraft and two primary gameplay modes, each with their own main objective and three difficulty levels to choose from, while progress is manually saved by docking on any Cybermart location in the city and choosing the option to save game via the cartridge's EEPROM and players are allowed to resume to resume by loading their last saved game at the title screen. The internal memory in the game cartridge also saves high-scores and other settings made by the player. There are also two types of control methods to choose from as well. A fourth "Suicidal" difficulty is unlocked after finishing the game in Hard on any mode and it also features support for the ProController.

Modes 
Mission mode is the default and main story mode of the game where across three cities (Jericho, San Diablo and Troy), each one having divided zones, the player (working for Cytox corporation) is assigned different types of missions to complete, such as retrieving either a lost computer or a data packet capsule, destroy a command tank from accessing the communication systems of Cytox, among others and by doing so, the player earn credits that can be spent on Cybermarts to buy upgrades to the Skyhammer aircraft, repair shields/damage and transfer from one zone of the city to another, in addition, the player receives update about a new mission to complete after clearing the previous one. Credits are also earned by destroying enemy units. The main objective of the mode is to occupy zones from the rival corporations of Cytox (CIC and Grubertech) in order to fully control the city and advance to the next one. Finishing the game in a lower difficulty prompts the player to replay the mode on a higher difficulty.

Battle mode is an alternative mode where no missions are assigned, instead the main objective of the player is to both protect their territory against enemy attack and destroy rival nodes to seize the occupied zone from a rival company. If one of the player's nodes is destroyed by the enemy, it is immediately occupied by the rival company and in order to take a rival zone, the player has to both destroy their node and its defenders. Once all the zones in the city are occupied by Cytox, the player has to return to the Cybermart dock in order to progress to the next city and in this mode, the game is over once the player's Skyhammer is destroyed. In both modes, if rival corporations manage to take all Cytox-occupied zones, the game is over.

Plot 
In the 21st century, cyberspace was the declared as the legal equivalent of hardspace, where virtual people managed every decision-making worldwide but in 2012, hackers injected a virus into the computerized version of the stock market, resulting in the alteration of the virtual people and destroying multiple global financial structures systematically in the process, turning ownership unprovable and over the next ten years, corporate warfares increased to the point where citizens were forced to choose either corporate slavery or being outlaws and the rise of street gang cultures also brought danger into the combat zone on city centres, leading the government in neutron bombing corporate headquarters to regain its authority. Even with this event, corporations found other means to keep fighting each other without attracting attention from authorities by the usage of devices such as robots and remotes in order to achieve their main goals, starting the Skyhammer era, where piloting one of the heavily armed Skyhammer aircraft was a privilege. A street mercenary punk joins the Cytox corporation as a trained junior pilot representing the company, in order to take on assignments and bounties to destroy battle groups from the competitors of the company: CFC and Grubertech, who have used means to cause negative territorial distribution to Cytox, but if the company does not see enough return from the pilot, his contract will be immediately terminated, while also negating his viability in the process.

Development 
Rebellion Developments was founded in 1992 by brothers Jason and Chris Kingsley. The pair just finished their academic degrees at the University of Oxford, and had ambitions of starting doctorates. while in their spare time, they did freelance work in the games industry. When their freelance jobs roles began to expand and taking on more management responsibilities, they decided to establish the company in Oxford. The foundation of the studio was laid when the brothers secured a deal with Atari UK. Rebellion presented a 3D dragon flight game demo for the Atari Falcon, which decipted dragons against vikings longships to directors at the publisher, including then-Atari UK CEO Bob Gleadow and Software Development Manager Alistair Bodin, who were seeking games for the then-upcoming Atari Jaguar. They were commissioned by the company to work on two titles for the Jaguar, Checkered Flag and Alien vs Predator, which both were released in 1994. The development team was expanded to assist with work on these games and among them was Justin Rae, who previously was the graphic designer in Checkered Flag for the Jaguar, worked as one of the city designers for Skyhammer.

Skyhammer was originally conceived by Chris Kingsley under the name Cyber Punk City in 1992, with the early design documents listing many of the gameplay elements that would be implemented into the final release but with a few changes made. The design documents also lists various elements that were either changed or scrapped altogether, such as enemies placed inside buildings or warehouses and support for a head-mounted display. The game uses an optimized 3D engine for the Jaguar by Rebellion, which features support for animated buildings, shading and distance fog. It was originally announced in late 1993 under its original name and was later previewed in late 1994, now under the name Hammer Head as 25% complete with plans for both a release in the middle of 1995 and for the Jaguar CD add-on. In their December 1994 preview of the game, Ultimate Future Games pointed out that the cockpit dashboard was being modelled from wood in order to be digitized into the game. It was showcased under its final name during E3 1995 and it was listed for an October release in the year for the Jaguar CD, with internal Atari Corp. documents from December 1995 listing the game as currently in development. However, these plans were cancelled at some point during development and the game was instead reworked for cartridge. It was last previewed by GamePro in 1996, featuring a mostly different-looking cockpit compared to the final release. Although it was reviewed by magazines such as Computer and Video Games, ST Format and Ultimate Future Games to positive reception, it was left unreleased due to Atari Corp. discontinuing the Jaguar and merging with JT Storage in 1996, resulting in Rebellion not being paid for the development of the game.

Release 
In December 1998, Songbird Productions contacted Rebellion in regards to Skyhammer, so it could be licensed and published. Although they agreed and licensed the game to Songbird, Rebellion did not provided the source code to the game and as a result, it was published as it was received. Skyhammer was first released on May 22, 2000. Although it originally did not came bundled with a keypad overlay, the 2014 expansion pack of Protector for the Jaguar, titled Protector: Resurgence for the Jaguar CD came packaged with a full color overlay to be used for the game.

Reception 

Skyhammer has received positive reviews both prior to cancellation by magazines and online publications since its release.

Eric Mylonas of GameFan gave the game a positive outlook, remarking that "While it doesn't feature incredibly blazing gameplay, it is decent fun.  It certainly doesn't feature the full-blown arcadey feel of Protector but it's a pretty decent game in its own right".

Andy Robertson of The Atari Times praised the game's graphics, dark atmosphere and free-roaming nature but criticized that when the players collide with a building, the aircraft loses speed, ruining the flow of the game but nevertheless, he remarked that "This is one of the best Jaguar games to date and is highly recommended. Great Stuff". In his review, Andy also stated how he managed to get a review copy of the game, prior to cancellation.

Ralph Karels from German magazine Video Games, however, gave the title a below-average score of 2 out of 5.

References

External links 
 
 Skyhammer at AtariAge
 Skyhammer at GameFAQs
 Skyhammer at MobyGames

2000 video games
Fiction set in 2022
Atari games
Atari Jaguar games
Atari Jaguar-only games
Cyberpunk video games
Dystopian video games
Rebellion Developments games
Science fiction video games
Shooter video games
Single-player video games
Songbird Productions games
Video games developed in the United Kingdom
Video games set in 2022
Video games with digitized sprites